Arthur Glyn Moses (30 May 1928– 29 September 2021) was a Welsh rugby union and professional rugby league footballer who played in the 1940s and 1950s.

Background
Glyn Moses was born in Nant-y-Moel, Wales.

Playing career

International honours
Glyn Moses represented Great Britain & France in the 37-31 victory over New Zealand at Carlaw Park, Auckland on 3 July 1957, won caps for Wales (RL) while at St. Helens in 1953 against England and France, won caps for Other Nationalities (RL) while at St. Helens in 1955 against England and France, and won caps for Great Britain (RL) while at St. Helens in 1955 against New Zealand (2 matches), in 1956 against Australia, in 1957 against France (3 matches), and in the 1957 Rugby League World Cup against France, Australia, and New Zealand.

Challenge Cup Final appearances
Glyn Moses played  in St. Helens' 10-15 defeat by Huddersfield in the 1953 Challenge Cup Final during the 1952–53 season at Wembley Stadium, London on Saturday 25 April 1953, in front of a crowd of 89,588, and played  in the 13-2 victory over Halifax in the 1955–56 Challenge Cup Final during the 1955–56 season at Wembley Stadium, London on Saturday 28 April 1956, in front of a crowd of 79,341.

County Cup Final appearances
Glyn Moses played , and scored a try in St. Helens' 16-8 victory over Wigan in the 1953 Lancashire County Cup Final during the 1953–54 season at Station Road, Swinton on Saturday 24 October 1953, and played  in the 3-10 defeat by Oldham in the 1956 Lancashire County Cup Final during the 1956–57 season at Central Park, Wigan on Saturday 20 October 1956.

Honoured at St Helens R.F.C.
Glyn Moses is a St Helens RFC Hall of Fame inductee.

Personal life
Glyn Moses was the younger brother of the rugby union, and rugby league footballer; Dai Moses.

Moses died on 29 September 2021, at the age of 93.

References

External links
Great Britain Statistics at englandrl.co.uk (statistics currently missing due to not having appeared for both Great Britain, and England)
Profile at saints.org.uk

1928 births
2021 deaths
Footballers who switched code
Great Britain & France rugby league team players
Great Britain national rugby league team players
Maesteg RFC players
Newbridge RFC players
Other Nationalities rugby league team players
Rugby league fullbacks
Rugby league players from Bridgend County Borough
Rugby union players from Bridgend County Borough
Salford Red Devils players
St Helens R.F.C. players
Wales national rugby league team players
Welsh rugby league players
Welsh rugby union players